"Blow Your Mind" is the first single released in Redman's rap career and is found on his acclaimed debut, Whut? Thee Album. It is produced by longtime Redman collaborator Erick Sermon and is co-produced by Redman himself. Its beat contains many samples including "The Payback (Intro)" by James Brown, "The Big Bang Theory" and "Theme From The Black Hole" by Parliament and "Dance Floor", "I Can Make You Dance" and "Computer Love" by Zapp. Its percussion also samples "Outstanding" by Gap Band and "Sing A Simple Song" by Sly & The Family Stone.

Track listing

A-side
 "Blow Your Mind" (Remix)
 "Blow Your Mind" (LP Version)

B-side
 "Blow Your Mind" (LP Instrumental) 
 "Blow Your Mind" (Remix Instrumental) 
 "How To Roll A Blunt"

References

1992 singles
1992 songs
Redman (rapper) songs
Def Jam Recordings singles
Funk-rap songs
Hardcore hip hop songs
Song recordings produced by Erick Sermon
Songs written by Redman (rapper)